Liyana Fizi (born 14 September 1983) is a Malaysian singer, musician, songwriter, composer and producer. She is a former lead singer of the Malaysian jazz band Estrella. She started performing music in 2006 and earned eight nominations in the Voize Independent Music Awards in 2008.

As a solo artist Liyana launched her debut album, Between the Lines, in September 2011. The album contains 11 songs, including songs composed by Liyana herself. The album was released under her own label, Liyana Fizi Music Publishing, and distributed locally by Soundscape Records. One of the songs, "Jatuh", was featured in the soundtrack of Azura, a movie directed by Aziz M. Osman.

Early life 
Liyana was born on 14 September 1983 at the Kuala Lumpur Hospital. The family lived for a while in Brunei when Liyana was a small child but later moved to Shah Alam, where she grew up. Her mother is from Negeri Sembilan with Jakun, Jawa, Chinese, and Dutch heritage. Her father's is from Kedah and has Thai, Mamak, Arab heritage.

Career

Estrella 
Liyana was one of the founding members of Malaysian band together with Adzwan Ani, Estrella during its formation in 2007 where she was the lead vocalist and rhythm guitarist. The band's debut eponymous studio album was released on 28 December 2007 under Laguna Records (now Laguna Music). The songs "Stay", "Ternyata", and "Take it Slow" were released as singles with music videos. Liyana left the band after her contract with the band and the label ended in 2009. Since then, she has been performing as a solo artist.

Solo career 
After Estrella was disbanded in 2009, Liyana decided to continue her solo career and set up her own publishing company, Liyana Fizi Music Publishing. In September 2011, her first solo album Between the Lines was launched at Bentley Music Mutiara Damansara with "Light Writing" as its first single.

Personal life 
Liyana married Zulfadly Helmi on 25 March 2018.

Discography

Album with Estrella
Estrella (2007)

Solo albums
Between the Lines (2011)

Filmography
 Kami Histeria (2014) – Cameo appearances

References

External links 

 Liyana Fizi on Last.fm

Living people
1983 births
People from Kuala Lumpur
Malaysian women singer-songwriters
Malaysian singer-songwriters
Malay-language singers
English-language singers from Malaysia
Malaysian people of Malay descent
Malaysian people of Thai descent
Malaysian people of Chinese descent
Malaysian people of Dutch descent
Malaysian people of Javanese descent
Malaysian people of Arab descent